Nicolae: The Rise of Antichrist is the third book in the Left Behind series. It was written by Tim LaHaye and Jerry B. Jenkins in 1997 and was published on Wednesday, October 1 of that year. It takes place 18–21 months into the Tribulation.

Plot
The members of the Tribulation Force have discovered that their pastor, Bruce Barnes, has been killed during the bombing of a hospital in World War III. Rayford Steele is quickly called to meet Global Community Supreme Potentate and Antichrist Nicolae Carpathia in Dallas, Texas to fly him to New Babylon, Iraq. Meanwhile, Cameron "Buck" Williams and Chloe Steele go to New Hope Village Church to inform Loretta about Bruce. Chloe is in downtown Chicago, Illinois when it is bombed by the Global Community. Buck is eventually able to rescue her after she crashed her Range Rover into a tree. Rayford hears about this and sends Amanda White back to Chicago to help them and to keep her safe because Nicolae was dropping bombs on major cities and he says to her, "If your flight doesn't leave before mine, board my flight", because Ray is piloting the flight that Nicolae is on. On the flight back to New Babylon, Rayford learns much about Nicolae's secret plans through a secret intercom device installed by his former boss at Pan-Continental Airlines, Earl Halliday. Rayford eventually arrives back in New Babylon.

Having heard from his friend Chaim Rosenzweig about Tsion Ben-Judah's loss of his wife and children to murder, Buck goes to Israel with charter pilot Ken Ritz. He is led by the two witnesses, Eli and Moishe in Jerusalem, to a boat near the Sea of Galilee. After proving that he is who he says he is, Buck is taken to the shelter where Tsion is hiding for his protection. Tsion has been accused of murdering his family, although he did not do so. Buck and Tsion are given a worn-out bus to drive to Egypt to meet Ritz for the escape to the United States. They meet many obstacles along the way, but are supernaturally protected and arrive in Chicago safely. During this time, Rayford meets with his friend Hattie Durham, and tries to discourage her from having an abortion of her baby that she conceived with Carpathia.

Because both Buck and Tsion are international fugitives, Rayford flies back to Chicago for the funeral service for Bruce. The service mainly consists of an evangelical message and predictions of what is to come, all outlined by Rayford himself. Rayford then returns to New Babylon to be joined by his wife later.

The stateside Tribulation Force meets Hattie Durham on her journey to see her relatives. After this, Amanda flies to New Babylon to join Rayford. Buck is driving to see Tsion at the hideout where he is when the worldwide earthquake predicted at the funeral begins. The sun goes dark, the moon turns blood-red, and meteors fall from the sky. A quarter of the world's population dies. Buck finds Tsion alive but trapped in the shelter. Condor 216 first officer Mac McCullum flies Carpathia and Rayford to Baghdad International Airport just as Global Community headquarters collapses. As the book ends, only Buck, Tsion, and Rayford are accounted for and safe among the Trib Force. Loretta is confirmed dead. Chloe and Amanda are missing.

Characters

Rayford Steele is pilot to Global Community Nicolae Carpathia, the Antichrist.
Cameron "Buck" Williams
Chloe Steele Williams
Amanda White Steele
Nicolae Carpathia
Leon Fortunato
President Gerald Fitzhugh, confirmed dead in this book
Earl Halliday, dies in this book
Chaim Rosenzweig
Hattie Durham
Tsion Ben-Judah
Ken Ritz
Loretta, dies in this book
Donny Moore
Sandy Moore

References

Left Behind series
1997 American novels
American post-apocalyptic novels
Novels set in Chicago
Novels set in Egypt
Novels set in Israel
Novels set in Iraq
Novels set in Jerusalem
Novels set in Washington, D.C.